The 2013–14 season was Aberdeen's 100th season in the top flight of Scottish football and their 102nd season overall. Aberdeen competed in the Scottish Premiership, Scottish Cup and Scottish League Cup. They won the Scottish League Cup in March 2014 with a win on penalties after a 0–0 draw against Inverness CT and reached the semi final of the Scottish Cup. In the league, they finished in third place behind Celtic and Motherwell, qualifying for Europe for the first time since 2009.

Results and fixtures

Friendly matches

Aberdeen played eight friendly matches; seven took place in pre-season and one in September.

Scottish Premiership

Scottish League Cup

Aberdeen entered the Scottish League Cup in the second round stage, having not qualified for Europe in 2012–13. They won the trophy on 16 March 2014 on penalties after a 0–0 draw with Inverness CT.

Scottish Cup

Aberdeen entered the Scottish Cup in the fourth round stage.

Statistics

Appearances and Goals
Last updated 11 May 2014

|}

Disciplinary record
Last updated 11 May 2014

Goalscorers
Last updated 11 May 2014

Team statistics

League table

Results by round

Results by opponent 

Source: 2013–14 Scottish Premiership article

Transfers

Players In

Players Out

See also
 List of Aberdeen F.C. seasons

References

Aberdeen F.C. seasons
Aberdeen